WSFB (1490 AM) is a radio station broadcasting a talk format, simulcasting WDDQ 92.1 FM Adel, Georgia. Licensed to Quitman, Georgia, United States.  The station is currently owned by Scott Matheson.

References

External links

SFB
Talk radio stations in the United States
Radio stations established in 1955
1955 establishments in Georgia (U.S. state)